Lydia is a 1941 drama film, directed by Julien Duvivier and starring Merle Oberon as Lydia MacMillan, a woman whose life is seen from her spoiled, immature youth through bitter and resentful middle years, until at last she is old and accepting. The supporting cast features Joseph Cotten, Edna May Oliver and George Reeves. The picture is a remake of Duvivier's Un carnet de bal (1937), which starred Marie Bell as the leading character.

Production 
The film was produced in the U.S. by London Films, the company controlled by producer Alexander Korda, who saw the film in part as a starring vehicle for his wife, Merle Oberon.  Julien Duvivier was hired to direct the film (under the working title Illusions), adapted from Un Carnet de Bal and reset in America by Ben Hecht and Samuel Hoffenstein, with a budget of over one million dollars.

Before approving the film's release, the Production Code Administration (also known as the "Hays Office") demanded a different ending to the film so that Lydia would "pay" for her love tryst in a cabin.  Despite his initial resistance, Korda gave in and shot several new endings to the film, claiming to like the one that was approved even better than the original.

Plot

At a reception honoring her work with blind and orphaned children, elderly Lydia Macmillan meets an old acquaintance, Dr. Michael Fitzpatrick, who has been in unrequited love with her for forty years.  Soon after, accepting Michael's invitation to tea, she discovers that he has also invited two other men from her past: Bob Willard, a football quarterback she knew when a young woman, and Frank Andre, a pianist who once worked at Lydia's orphanage.

Lydia, now a self-described spinster, reminisces about her memories of each of the men, and one other, Richard Mason, an adventurous traveler.  All had been in love with her at one time or another, but she had never married. Most of the following narrative is told through a series of flashbacks with occasional voice-over narration by Lydia.

In Boston in 1897, the young and impulsive Lydia is preparing to go to a dance. Her guardian is her grandmother, a hypochondriac who chases away her doctor.  She disapproves of Lydia's dress as inappropriate for Boston society, even though she herself is the widow of a sea captain and came from a less than respectable background.  The family butler) intervenes when his son Michael arrives, having just graduated from medical school.  Michael humors the old woman's complaints, and she agrees to let Michael escort Lydia to the ball.

On their way to the ball, Lydia tells Michael that she is in love with football player Bob Willard.  As they talk, the sleigh is passed by another driven by a young man with a moustache, and Lydia impulsively grabs the reins and races him.  Soon after, Bob calls on Lydia at her house, having been coached by Michael about how to speak and act in order to please the grandmother.  He gets carried away, however, being apparently drunk and is ejected from the house.

When Lydia tells Michael that she plans to elope with Bob, Michael threatens to tell her grandmother, but changes his mind because he wants to see her happy.  The planned marriage does not happen, however, because the magistrate who would perform the ceremony is unavailable.  Nonetheless, the couple go to the hotel room Bob had reserved for their honeymoon, but Bob gets drunk and attempts to seduce or assault Lydia.  She flees and takes a cab away from the man who had raced her earlier. He agrees to help the "damsel in distress."

In the present, the now-aged Bob tells Lydia that he has felt guilty about that night for the last forty years, but Lydia forgives him.  She continues her story. Seeing Michael off to a troop ship heading to Cuba during the Spanish-American War, she realizes that another soldier is the same man who raced her and who gave her his carriage. She finally learns his name, Captain Richard Mason.  When the ship leaves, though, Lydia meets a young blind boy and escorts him to his impoverished home.  She vows to use her money and time to help such children.

At the school she has founded, Lydia meets blind pianist Frank Andre, who goes to work at the school and also falls in love with her.  Lydia, however, turns him down as well, while Michael remains a friend and rejected suitor. At another ball, Lydia is swept off her feet by Richard Mason.  The two steal away to her family's seaside home, where the couple share what seem to be a couple of idyllic weeks.  Richard leaves Lydia behind when he goes to the mainland on a sailboat for supposed business, but the boat returns with only the home's caretaker, who gives her a letter from Richard saying that he has to settle affairs with another woman who has "a claim" on him.  Many months later, in Boston, Lydia finally receives another letter from Richard, asking her to meet him at a church on New Year's Eve, but he fails to appear.

With bitterness and regret, Lydia tells the three men about how she finally accepted Michael's marriage proposal, even though she could not return his love.  That match also never happens, however, when her grandmother dies just before her wedding. Lydia decides to devote the rest of her life exclusively to her school.

As Lydia finishes her story, one final guest arrives, the now aged and bearded Richard Mason.  Lydia seems willing to forgive him, but Mason does not remember her at all. Lydia describes this event as the "perfect punishment" for her past "sinful" behavior.  She finally concedes to Michael that there was never only one true Lydia; she was a different person to everyone who met her.

Cast
 Merle Oberon as Lydia MacMillan
 Joseph Cotten as Michael Fitzpatrick
 Hans Jaray as Frank Andre
 Alan Marshal as Richard Mason
 Edna May Oliver as Sarah MacMillan
 George Reeves as Bob Willard
 John Halliday as Fitzpatrick
 Sara Allgood as Mary, Johnny's Mother
 Billy Roy as Johnny
 Frank Conlan as Old Ned
 Harry Cording as Detective (uncredited)
 Herbert Rawlinson as Dignitary (uncredited)

Reception
Professor Tino Balio described the film as achieving  only a moderate success at the box office.  The Ultimate Movie Rankings database lists the box office returns as only one million dollars, hardly breaking even with the film's budget and ranking number 144 out of 221 films listed for 1941.

That same database lists the film as having received 65% favorable reviews,  Variety in its review commented, "Dialog and narrative, with frequent use of cutbacks for the story telling, does not add to the speed of the unreeling under the leisurely direction by Duvivier,"" but praised Merle Oberon's performance and the makeup used to age the characters.

New York Times critic Bosley Crowther compared the film unfavorably to Duvivier's Un Carnet de Bal, remarking, "The fault, one can easily say, lies in the construction and writing of the film. The story is loosely conceived and then the dialogue is pitched on in thick gobs—high-flown, poetic speeches and chunks of solemn soliloquy."

Awards
Composer Miklos Rosza was nominated for the Academy Award for Best Original Score—Dramatic or Comedy Picture at the 14th Academy Awards.

References

External links
 
 
 
 

1940s English-language films
1941 films
United Artists films
Films directed by Julien Duvivier
1941 drama films
American black-and-white films
American remakes of French films
Films scored by Miklós Rózsa
Films with screenplays by Ben Hecht
Films produced by Alexander Korda
American drama films
1940s American films